Astor Theater was a historic movie theater located in Reading, Berks County, Pennsylvania.  It was designed by architect William Harold Lee in the Art Deco style, and built in 1928. The theater seated 2,478. It operated until 1975, then was demolished in 1998 to clear space for the Sovereign Center arena (since renamed the Santander Arena). Some architectural details, such as the ornate chandelier and gates, were salvaged from the Astor Theatre and recycled in the Sovereign Center.

It was listed on the National Register of Historic Places in 1978, and delisted in 2000.

References

External links
 Astor Theatre, Penn St., Reading, Pennsylvania: 1 drawing of theater facade, at Library of Congress Prints and Photographs Division Washington, D.C. 
 The Astor Theater in Reading, PA, YouTube video

Buildings and structures in Reading, Pennsylvania
Art Deco architecture in Pennsylvania
Theatres completed in 1928
Theatres in Pennsylvania
Former National Register of Historic Places in Pennsylvania
Buildings and structures demolished in 1998
1928 establishments in Pennsylvania
Demolished buildings and structures in Pennsylvania
Demolished theatres in the United States